Mount Grytøyr is a broad ice-topped mountain,  high, between Flogeken Glacier and Stuttflog Glacier in the Mühlig-Hofmann Mountains of Queen Maud Land, Antarctica. It was mapped by Norwegian cartographers from surveys and air photos by the Sixth Norwegian Antarctic Expedition (1956–60) and named for B. Grytøyr, a meteorologist with the expedition (1956–58).

See also
Skredbotnen Cirque
Stuttfloget Cliff

References

Mountains of Queen Maud Land
Princess Martha Coast